End of the World is the debut studio album by Greek progressive rock band Aphrodite's Child. It features the UK top 30 hit "Rain and Tears".

Track listing
All songs written by Boris Bergman and Vangelis Papathanassiou except as noted

Personnel
Vangelis - keyboards, piano, organ, clavichord, flutes, vibraphone, occasional vocals
Demis Roussos - vocals, bass, electric and acoustic guitars
Loukas Sideras - drums, percussion, timpani

Additional personnel 
Claude Chauvet: additional vocals (1, 4)

References

External links
 

Aphrodite's Child albums
1968 debut albums
Philips Records albums